James Hubert Theobald Charles Butler, 7th Marquess of Ormonde, MBE (19 April 1899 – 25 October 1997) was the son of Reverend Lord Theobald Butler and Lady Annabella Brydon Gordon. He was the 7th and last holder of the title Marquess of Ormonde and the 25th holder of the title Earl of Ormond. The title Earl of Ormond is one of the oldest titles in the peerages in the British Isles, having first been granted to James Butler, 1st Earl of Ormond, who married a granddaughter of Edward I of England.

Military service 
Charles Butler was trained as a British Army officer at Sandhurst and received a commission as a lieutenant in the King's Royal Rifle Corps.

During the First World War, he was injured in a gas attack in France in 1916 and spent the rest of the war in hospital. He was appointed a Member of the Order of the British Empire (MBE) in 1921.

Marriage and children
During the late 1920s, he emigrated to the United States of America, where he met Nan Gilpin, daughter of Garth Griffith Gilpin, whom he married on 3 March 1935. They had two daughters:

 The Lady Ann Soukup (Constance Ann Butler) (b. 13 December 1940)
 The Lady Cynthia Hammer (Violet Cynthia Lilah Butler) (b. 31 August 1946)

He married, secondly, Elizabeth Rarden, daughter of Charles R. Rarden, in 1976. This marriage produced no children.

Marquess of Ormonde 
In 1971, Charles Butler inherited the Marquessate of Ormonde, the Earldoms of Ormond and Ossory, the Thurles Viscountcy and the Butler of Llanthony Barony upon the death of his cousin, James Arthur Butler, 6th Marquess of Ormonde. He was thenceforth known as The Most Honourable Charles Butler, 7th Marquess of Ormonde.

During the later years of his life, Lord Ormonde maintained an active role as President of the Butler Society. He made regular visits to the city of Kilkenny in Ireland, where the former principal seat of his family, Kilkenny Castle, was located. Ownership of the Castle (which the Butler Family had not inhabited since 1935) had been transferred to the Town and People of Kilkenny by his predecessor, the 6th Marquess, in 1967.

Lord Ormonde died on 25 October 1997 in Chicago, Illinois, aged 98.

Without a male heir, the marquessate became extinct in 1997, while the earldom is dormant. The 18th Viscount Mountgarret, who succeeded his father in 2004 is understood to be the likely heir of the former Marquess' related title Earl of Ormond but has not successfully proven the claim.

Arms

References

1899 births
1997 deaths
Charles
Charles
Members of the Order of the British Empire
King's Royal Rifle Corps officers